Juan de Dios Machuca Valdés (born 7 March 1951) is a Chilean football defender who played for Chile in the 1974 FIFA World Cup. He also played for Unión Española.

References

External links
FIFA profile

1951 births
Living people
Chilean footballers
Chile international footballers
Association football defenders
Unión Española footballers
1974 FIFA World Cup players